Blue Balloon may refer to:

Blue Balloon, a 2007 rock song performed by Ween and released on La Cucaracha (album)
Blue Balloon (The Hourglass Song), a 1973 song written by Joseph Brooks for Jeremy (film)

Blue Balloons are actually a purple variant balloon.